Chicoreus axicornis, the axicornis murex or centre-horned murex, is a species of sea snail, a marine gastropod mollusk in the family Muricidae, the murex snails or rock snails.

Description
This shell is slender, with long, curved, acute shoulder spines. Color ranges from whitish or reddish to dark brown. Aperture is broad and rounded. Columellar lip is narrow, smooth. Outer lip is erect and crenulate. Siphonal canal is long, narrow and recurved.

Distribution
This species is widespread from Indian Ocean to Philippines.

References

 Lamarck, J. B. P. A., 1822 Histoire naturelle des animaux sans vertèbres, vol. 7, p. 711
 Houart, R., 1992. The genus Chicoreus and related genera (Gastropoda: Muricidae) in the Indo-West Pacific. Mémoires du Muséum national d'Histoire naturelle 154(A): 1-188

External links
 Biolib
 
 MNHN, Paris: lectotype

Gastropods described in 1822
Chicoreus